Kjell Lutteman (born 1 May 1937) is a Swedish bobsledder. He competed in the two-man and the four-man events at the 1964 Winter Olympics.

References

1937 births
Living people
Swedish male bobsledders
Olympic bobsledders of Sweden
Bobsledders at the 1964 Winter Olympics
Sportspeople from Stockholm
20th-century Swedish people